Pércio Zancani (born 11 November 1927) was a Brazilian rower. He competed in the men's coxless pair event at the 1948 Summer Olympics.

References

External links
 

1927 births
Possibly living people
Brazilian male rowers
Olympic rowers of Brazil
Rowers at the 1948 Summer Olympics